Hurwenen is a village in the Dutch province of Gelderland. It is a part of the municipality of Maasdriel, and lies about 11 km southwest of Tiel. Thijs Straver is the mayor of Hurwenen. 

Hurwenen was a separate municipality until 1955, when it was merged with Rossum, except for a short period between 1818 and 1821, when it was also a part of Rossum.

History 
It was first mentioned in 1244 as de Huerwen. The etymology is unclear. Just before 1600, Hurwenen become a battlefield in the Dutch Revolt and the village was destroyed. About 40 years later, the area was resettled. In 1840, it was home to 398 people. Around 1850, a brickworks was established in the village. During World War II, a V-1 flying bomb hits Hurwenen killing 9 people and destroying the church.

Vento Vivimus is a windmill which was built in 1875 and translates to "we live of the wind". It was damaged during World War II. In 1988, a large restoration commenced, and since 1991, Vento Vivimus is able to function as a grist mill again.

Gallery

References

Populated places in Gelderland
Former municipalities of Gelderland
Maasdriel